= Competition and Consumer Authority =

Regulatory agency for market competition in Botswana

- Formation: 2011
- Chief Executive: Tebelelo Pule
- Website: www.competitionauthority.co.bw

The Competition and Consumer Authority (CCA) is the regulatory agency for market competition in Botswana.

== History ==
=== Botswana Competition Authority (2011–2019) ===
The Botswana Competition Authority (BCA) was established in 2011 by the Botswana Competition Act. The regulations granting the BCA its powers came into effect on 14 October 2011.

In April 2016, Tebelelo Pule was appointed temporary Chief Executive, succeeding Thula Kaira. This appointment was made permanent in October 2017.

In 2018, Botswana enacted the Competition Act.

=== Competition and Consumer Authority (2019–present) ===
On 2 December 2019, the BCA absorbed the functions of the Consumer Affairs department of the Ministry of Investment, Trade, and Industry, becoming the Competition and Consumer Authority (CCA).
